Local elections were held in the United Kingdom in 1987. The projected share of the vote was Conservatives 38%, Labour 32%, Liberal-SDP Alliance 27%. It was the first time since 1983 that the Conservatives had enjoyed the largest share of the vote in local council elections.

Soon after the elections, Prime Minister Margaret Thatcher called a general election which resulted in a second successive Conservative landslide, although Labour managed to cut the government's overall majority, while the Alliance endured another disappointing performance and was soon disbanded as the SDP and Liberals agreed on a merger the following year.

The number of councillors was somewhat reduced from the previous year.  The Conservatives lost 75 seats, Labour lost 234 and the Liberal-SDP Alliance gained 669.

Summary of results

England

Metropolitan boroughs
All 36 metropolitan borough councils had one third of their seats up for election.

District councils

Whole council
In 180 districts the whole council was up for election.

Six of those districts - East Devon, Hinckley and Bosworth, Leicester, Mid Sussex, West Dorset and Woodspring - returned to whole councils elections having previously been elected by thirds.

In 5 districts there were new ward boundaries, following further electoral boundary reviews by the Local Government Boundary Commission for England.

‡ New ward boundaries

Third of council
In 116 districts one third of the council was up for election.

Wales

District councils

References

Local elections 2006. House of Commons Library Research Paper 06/26.
Vote 1999 BBC News
Vote 2000 BBC News